Founders Fund is a San Francisco based venture capital firm. Formed in 2005, Founders Fund had more than $11 billion in aggregate capital under management as of 2022. The firm invests across all stages and sectors, including aerospace, artificial intelligence, advanced computing, energy, health, and consumer Internet, with a portfolio that includes Airbnb, Lyft, Spotify, Stripe, and Oscar Health.  Founders Fund was the first institutional investor in Space Exploration Technologies (SpaceX) and Palantir Technologies, and one of the earliest investors in Facebook. The firm’s partners, including Peter Thiel, Ken Howery and Brian Singerman, have been founders, early employees and investors at companies including PayPal, Google, Palantir Technologies, and SpaceX.

History

The firm was organized by Peter Thiel, Ken Howery, and Luke Nosek in early 2005 and raised its first fund of $50 million from individual entrepreneurs and angel investors in January of that year. Sean Parker, co-founder of Napster and ex-president of Facebook, joined in 2006.  In 2007, the firm raised a new fund of $220 million.

In 2010, the firm raised its third fund, with $250 million in committed capital, and in 2011, a fourth fund with $625 million of committed capital was raised.

In 2014, Founders Fund raised a $1 billion fifth suite of funds, bringing the firm's aggregate capital under management to more than $2 billion.

In 2016, Founders Fund raised a sixth, $1.3 billion fund, bringing the firm's aggregate capital under management to more than $3 billion.

In 2020, Founders Fund raised a seventh flagship fund and its first growth fund, representing $3 billion in new capital and bringing the firm's aggregate capital under management to more than $6 billion.

In 2022, Founders Fund raised an eighth flagship fund and its second growth fund, representing over $5 billion in new capital and bringing the firm's aggregate capital under management to more than $11 billion.

In 2023, Founders Fund advised companies to withdraw money from Silicon Valley Bank upon announcement of their attempt to raise capital, helping to spur a bank run on the bank and inducing the FDIC to take over.

Partners
As of spring 2022, the firm had eight Partners: 
Peter Thiel, founder and former CEO and chairman of PayPal
Brian Singerman, creator of iGoogle
Keith Rabois
Lauren Gross
Scott Nolan
Trae Stephens
Napoleon Ta
Matias Van Thienen

Former partners include:
Cyan Banister
Ken Howery, founder and former CFO of PayPal
Kevin Hartz, co-founder of Eventbrite
Sean Parker, co-founder of Napster and Facebook's first president
Bruce Gibney, founder and author
Geoff Lewis (investor), co-founder of Bedrock

Investments
Founders Fund is a generalist firm investing in companies across all sectors, stages and geographies. 

The firm's investments include Airbnb, DeepMind, Lyft, Facebook, Flexport, Palantir Technologies, SpaceX, Spotify, Stripe, Wish, Neuralink, Nubank, and Twilio.

References

External links
  (official website)

Financial services companies established in 2005
Venture capital firms of the United States
Companies based in San Francisco